Chlorantraniliprole (Rynaxypyr) is an insecticide of the ryanoid classes. Chlorantraniliprole was developed world-wide by DuPont and belongs to a class of selective insecticides featuring a novel mode of action to control a range of pests belonging to the order Lepidoptera (moth) and some other Coleoptera (beetle), Diptera (fly), and Isoptera (termite) species.

Chlorantraniliprole opens muscular calcium channels, in particular the ryanodine receptor, rapidly causing paralysis and ultimately death of sensitive species. The differential selectivity chlorantraniliprole has towards insect ryanodine receptors explains the outstanding profile of low mammalian toxicity. Chlorantraniliprole is active on chewing pest insects primarily by ingestion and secondarily by contact.

Chlorantraniliprole is an active ingredient in the insecticidal products Ferterra (0.4% chlorantraniliprole) and Coragen (18.5% chlorantraniliprole ).

References

Insecticides
Benzamides
Pyridines
Pyrazoles